Kiliaan may refer to:

 28059 Kiliaan, a main-belt asteroid named after Cornelis Kiliaan
 Cornelis Kiliaan (1528–1607), a Flemish linguist

See also 
 Kilian, also written as Cillian, Killian, Killion